The Afghanistan men's cricket team toured the United Arab Emirates in February 2023 to play three Twenty20 International (T20I) matches. The dates for the tour were confirmed in January 2023. In November 2022, the Afghanistan Cricket Board signed a five-year agreement with the Emirates Cricket Board to play their home matches in the UAE. This was the first annual series between the two sides to be arranged as part of the agreement.

Squads

On 28 January 2023, Afghanistan named a preliminary squad of 23 players for a training camp in the UAE.

T20I series

1st T20I

2nd T20I

3rd T20I

References

External links
 Series home at ESPNcricinfo

2023 in Emirati cricket
2023 in Afghan cricket
International cricket competitions in 2022–23
Afghan cricket tours of the United Arab Emirates